"Dizzy" is a song by American band Goo Goo Dolls, written by lead vocalist and guitarist Johnny Rzeznik. It was released as a single from their sixth studio album, Dizzy Up the Girl (1998). The song peaked at number nine on the US Billboard Modern Rock Tracks chart in May 1999 and also reached number 28 in Canada and number 50 in Australia. An extended play (EP) titled Dizzy EP was released the next month featuring this song as well as others from previous albums. The music video stars actress Shannyn Sossamon.

Track listings
Australian version
 "Dizzy" – 2:41
 "Slide" (acoustic) – 3:40

Dizzy EP
 "Dizzy" – 2:43
 "Slide" (acoustic version) – 3:17
 "Naked" (remix) – 4:08
 "Long Way Down" (radio version) – 3:32
 "January Friend" – 2:43

Charts

References

1999 singles
1999 songs
Goo Goo Dolls EPs
Goo Goo Dolls songs
Song recordings produced by Rob Cavallo
Songs written by John Rzeznik
Warner Records singles